Resurrection (also known as Rebirth and Revenge) is a 2005 South Korean television series starring Uhm Tae-woong, Han Ji-min, So Yi-hyun, Go Joo-won, Kang Shin-il, Kim Kap-soo, Kim Kyu-chul, Gi Ju-bong, and Lee Jung-gil. The series is about a man who pretends to be his identical twin brother in order to unearth the conspiracy surrounding his father's death and wreak revenge on his murderers. It aired on KBS2 from June 1 to August 18, 2005 on Wednesdays and Thursdays at 21:50 for 24 episodes.

The series is the first installment of the revenge trilogy by director Park Chan-hong and writer Kim Ji-woo, followed by The Devil in 2007 and Don't Look Back: The Legend of Orpheus in 2013.

Plot 
After a horrific car crash kills his father, young Ha-eun is taken in by a family of strangers and raised to be a caring, happy young man (Uhm Tae-woong). He becomes a police officer and begins to look into the death of his father, only to discover some horrifying truths about not only the accident, but also his own identity. Ha-eun discovers that his name is really Yoo Kang-hyuk and that he has a twin brother called Shin-hyuk (also played by Uhm), who is now VP of a large company. When a cruel twist of fate gives Ha-eun the opportunity to assume his brother's identity, he sees this as his chance to discover the truth about his tragic past and avenge the wrongs done to him and his family.

Cast 
 Uhm Tae-woong as Seo Ha-eun/Yoo Shin-hyuk 
 Kang San as young Ha-eun
 Kwak Jung-wook as teenage Ha-eun 
 Han Ji-min as Seo Eun-ha 
 Park Eun-bin as teenage Eun-ha 
 So Yi-hyun as Lee Kang-joo
 Kang Shin-il as Seo Jae-soo
 Kim Kap-soo as Lee Tae-joon
 Kim Kyu-chul as Choi Dong-chan
 Lee Jung-gil as Kang In-chul
 Gi Ju-bong as Jung Sang-gook
 Go Joo-won as Jung Jin-woo
 Go Myung-hwan as Kim Soo-chul
 Jo Jae-wan as Ahn Jae-hoon
 Sunwoo Eun-sook as Kim Yi-hwa
 Yoo Hye-jung as Yoon Mi-jung
 Lee Dong-gyu as Park Hee-soo
 Choi Yong-min as Heo Deok-woo
 Lee Yeon-hee as Kang Shin-young
 Lee Dae-yeon as Gyung Gi-do
 Kim Yoon-seok as Cheon Gong-myung ("President Cheon")
 Joo Jin-mo as Park Sang-chul
 Ahn Nae-sang as Yoo Geon-ha
 Lee Han-wi as Im Dae-shik
 Kim Gi-bok as Hwang Jong-in
 Choi Won-seok as Yang Man-chul
 Nam Hyun-joo as Man-chul's wife
 Jung Ho-bin as Lee Jung-mu
 Park Kwang-jung

Reception
In the same timeslot as hit series My Lovely Sam Soon, ratings suffered as a result, going down as much as 7% compared to Sam-soon'''s high 40s. But broadcaster KBS received numerous requests from viewers to re-run the show during weekends, so they could watch both dramas; the re-runs recorded encouraging numbers. And after Sam-soon finished airing, ratings for Resurrection shot up to 20%, reaching a peak of 22.9% on the drama's finale, with the number of messages posted by viewers on its bulletin board surpassing one million. Called a "mania drama" (Korean slang for cult hit - TV series with a tremendous following online, that somehow end up struggling in the ratings), Resurrection gained praise for its tight plotting, complex characterization, and a career-making, emotionally intense performance from Uhm Tae-woong.

Ratings

Source: TNS Media Korea

Awards and nominations

International broadcastResurrection first aired in Japan on cable channel So-net beginning April 5, 2006, which was lead actor Uhm Tae-woong's birthday. Its popularity led to reruns on multiple channels, including Tokyo MX, FBC Fukuoka TV and TV Hokkaido.

International remakes
In October 2015, Batman producer Michael Uslan acquired the rights to remake five KBS dramas in the United States, including Resurrection. Though the series was unsuccessful in the ratings during its run, KBS Content Business Office manager Jung Ji-young explained that Uslan chose it for its strong and dramatic plot.

In 2016, the series was adapted in Turkey under the title Kış Güneşi, which is also known under its English-translated title Winter Sun''.

References

External links 
 Resurrection official KBS website 
 
 

Korean-language television shows
Korean Broadcasting System television dramas
2005 South Korean television series debuts
2005 South Korean television series endings
South Korean thriller television series